The Prix Iris for Best First Film is an annual film award, presented by Québec Cinéma as part of its Prix Iris awards program, to honour the year's best debut film made within the Cinema of Quebec.

The award was presented for the first time at the 22nd Quebec Cinema Awards in 2020.

2020s

See also
John Dunning Best First Feature Award
Toronto International Film Festival Award for Best Canadian First Feature Film

References

Awards established in 2020
First Film
Directorial debut film awards